Emre Nefiz (born 24 November 1994) is a Turkish footballer who plays as a winger for Kocaelispor.

Nefiz was born in Germany to parents of Turkish descent, and has represented the Turkey national under-19 football team.

References

External links
 
 
 

1994 births
Living people
Footballers from Frankfurt
Turkish footballers
Turkey youth international footballers
German footballers
German people of Turkish descent
Association football wingers
2. Bundesliga players
Süper Lig players
TFF First League players
TFF Second League players
FSV Frankfurt players
Gaziantepspor footballers
Alanyaspor footballers
Adana Demirspor footballers
Giresunspor footballers
Ümraniyespor footballers
Kocaelispor footballers